Venus Williams was the defending champion but did not compete that year.

Serena Williams won in the final 6–3, 6–2 against Amélie Mauresmo.

Seeds
A champion seed is indicated in bold text while text in italics indicates the round in which that seed was eliminated. The top four seeds received a bye to the second round.

  Serena Williams (champion)
  Daniela Hantuchová (quarterfinals)
  Amélie Mauresmo (final)
  Jelena Dokić (quarterfinals)
  Patty Schnyder (first round)
  Silvia Farina Elia (first round)
  Anna Pistolesi (first round)
  Eleni Daniilidou (semifinals)

Draw

Final

Section 1

Section 2

External links
 2003 Open Gaz de France draw

Singles
Open Gaz de France